Oregon Route 205 (OR 205) is a state highway in Harney County, Oregon, running from Roaring Springs Ranch to OR 78 near Burns. OR 205 is known as the Frenchglen Highway No. 440 (see Oregon highways and routes).
The highway has also been designated the High Desert Discovery Scenic Byway by the Bureau of Land Management. Part of OR 205 also is used in the Steens Mountain Back Country Byway, a loop road around Steens Mountain.

Route description

OR 205 begins at the Roaring Springs Ranch as a continuation of Catlow Valley Road, which connects with Nevada State Route 292 near Denio, Nevada. It travels north along the edge of the Catlow Valley and turns east to enter Frenchglen in Blitzen Valley. The highway continues north on the rim of Jackass Mountain through parts of the Malheur National Wildlife Refuge, crossing between Harney Lake and Malheur Lake in Sunset Valley. After briefly turning west to cross Wrights Point, OR 205 continues due north through Harney Valley and terminates at a junction with OR 78 east of Burns.

Major intersections

See also

References

205
Transportation in Harney County, Oregon